Knyaz Pozharsky (Russian: АПЛ Князь Пожарский) is a  nuclear-powered ballistic missile submarine currently under construction for the Russian Navy. The submarine is named after Knyaz Dmitry Pozharsky.

History 
Project 955A was designed by Sergei Kovalev of the Rubin Design Bureau as an improved variant of the original Project 955. Construction of the Knyaz Pozharsky began with the keel laying on 23 December 2016 at the Sevmash shipyard in Severodvinsk, part of the United Shipbuilding Corporation. At the time the keel was laid, Russian Navy's Deputy Commander-in-Chief Vice Admiral Viktor Bursuk declared "The 955A series is coming to an end with this submarine. Now the Navy is working together with the Rubin Design Bureau on modernization of the project." However, in November 2018, additional two vessels were confirmed to be built by 2028.

Knyaz Pozharsky is projected to be floated out for the first stages of sea trials before 2022. When commissioned, it is to be deployed with the Russia's Northern Fleet.

References 

Borei-class submarines